Toy Willie Ledbetter (October 30, 1927 – July 25, 1995) was a professional American football player who played running back for four seasons for the Philadelphia Eagles.

References

1927 births
1995 deaths
People from Morris, Oklahoma
Players of American football from Oklahoma
American football running backs
Philadelphia Eagles players
Oklahoma State Cowboys football players